Whole New You is the sixth studio album by American singer-songwriter Shawn Colvin, released in 2001 by Columbia Records. It was her first new release in over four years. While A Few Small Repairs is, "her divorce album," Whole New You is about family, commitment, and acceptance. The album retains the sixties folk-pop feel provided by collaborator John Leventhal, with Rolling Stone writing that album tracks "A Matter of Minutes" and "Whole New You" "expertly renovates antique Sixities teen pop." According to William Ruhlmann of AllMusic, "The most interesting song is the most complex one," "Another Plane Went Down".

Track listing

Personnel

Musicians
Shawn Colvin – vocals
John Leventhal – banjo, bass, guitar, percussion, keyboards
Tony Garnier – double bass
Joe Quigley – bass
Shawn Pelton – drums, percussion
Marc Cohn – background vocals
James Taylor – harmony vocals
Kenny White – background vocals
Rick DePofi – clarinet, piccolo, recorder, sax
Joe Bonadio – percussion, drum fills
Michael Rhodes – bass
Sandra Park – violin
Fiona Simon – violin
Robert Rinehart – viola
Eileen Moon – cello
Larry Farrell – trombone
Tony Kadleck – flugelhorn
Alan J. Stepansky – cello

Technical
John Leventhal – producer, engineer, horn arrangements, string arrangements
Rick DePofi – engineer
Bob Clearmountain – mixing
David Boucher – engineer, mixing
Fred Remmert – engineer
Craig Bishop – engineer
Gina Fant-Saez – engineer
Matt Kane – engineer
Tom Schick – engineer
Noah Simon – engineer
Bob Ludwig – mastering
Stephen Barber – string arrangements

Design
Kate Breakey – photography
Mary Maurer – art direction
Frank Ockenfels – photography

Chart positions

References

2001 albums
Shawn Colvin albums
Albums produced by John Leventhal
Columbia Records albums